Menominee Township is one of twenty-three townships in Jo Daviess County, Illinois, USA.  As of the 2010 census, its population was 1,122 and it contained 419 housing units.

Geography
Menominee is Townships 28 (part) and 29 (part) North, Ranges 1 (part) and 2 (part) West of the Fourth Principal Meridian.

Cities, towns, villages
 Menominee.

Major highways
  U.S. Route 20.

Airports and landing strips
 Coursens Landing Airport.

Rivers
 Mississippi River.
 Little Menominee River.
 Sinsinawa River.

Demographics

School districts
 East Dubuque Community Unit School District 119.
 Galena Unit School District 120.

Political districts
 Illinois' 16th congressional district.
 State House District 89.
 State Senate District 45.

References
 
 United States Census Bureau 2007 TIGER/Line Shapefiles.
 United States National Atlas.

External links
 Jo Daviess County official site.
 City-Data.com.
 Illinois State Archives.
 Township Officials of Illinois.

Townships in Jo Daviess County, Illinois
Townships in Illinois